Brahmdev  is a village development committee in Kanchanpur District in Mahakali Zone of far-western region of Nepal. At the time of the 1991 Nepal census it had a population of 1769 people living in 314 individual households.

References

External links
UN map of the municipalities of Darchula District

Populated places in Darchula District